Martin Kennedy (born March 24, 1978) is a pianist and composer of contemporary classical music.

Biography 

Martin Kennedy was born in Wakefield, England and grew up in Pennsylvania and Alabama.  He holds a Doctorate in Music Composition from the Juilliard School where he studied as a C.V. Starr fellow under Milton Babbitt and Samuel Adler.  He completed his master's degree in composition at the Jacobs School of Music, where he also received his bachelor's degrees in composition and piano performance.

Kennedy has written extensively for orchestra, chamber ensembles, and solo instruments.  His awards include first prize in the '2 Agosto' International Composing Competition, the 2010 ASCAP Rudolf Nissim Prize for Best Orchestral Work, five ASCAP Morton Gould Young Composer Awards, a BMI Young Composer Award, Composer-In-Residence for the Alabama Symphony Orchestra, the Suzanne and Lee Ettleson Prize, an Aaron Copland Award, and residencies at the MacDowell and Yaddo artist colonies.  His music is published by Theodore Presser Company and G. Schirmer Inc.

Selected works

Orchestral works
 Drift (2021)
 Forest Dark and Stars Above (2018)
 Siren, blind (2016)
 Three Pieces for Orchestra (1999)

Concerti 
 Pull Pin and Throw for trombone and orchestra (2021)
 Violin Concerto (2020)
 Sonata for violin and orchestra (John Corigliano, arr. Kennedy) (2012)
 Trivial Pursuits for violin and orchestra (2009)
 Piano Concerto (2008)
 Totentanz for violin and orchestra (Franz Liszt, arr. Kennedy and Lara St. John) (2007)
 Flute Concerto (1999)

Chamber music 
 Dry Falls for two guitars (2021)
 An Affirmation for chamber choir (2015)
 Distant Channels for bass trombone and percussion (2014)
 Czardashian Rhapsody (arr.) for violin and piano (2013)
 Desplazamiento for piccolo and piano (2013)
 Trivial Pursuits for violin and piano (2009)
 Four Songs for flute and piano (1998)
 These Parting Gifts for two violins and piano (1997)
 Souvenir for flute and piano (1995)

External links

Martin Kennedy's page at Theodore Presser Company
Alabama Symphony Website

References

1978 births
20th-century classical composers
American male classical composers
American classical composers
21st-century classical composers
Living people
Central Washington University faculty
21st-century American composers
20th-century American composers
20th-century American male musicians
21st-century American male musicians